The Casio FX-7000G is a calculator which is widely known as being the world's first graphing calculator available to the public. It was introduced to the public and later manufactured between 1985 and c. 1988. Notable features are its ability to graph functions, and that it is programmable. The calculator offers 82 scientific functions and is capable of manual computation for basic arithmetic problems.

Features

Mathematical
The calculator can compute basic arithmetic functions with a precision up to 13 digits. Many functions integrated into the calculator include arithmetic and algebraic computations such as:

square roots
reciprocals
exponential functions
factorials
logarithms
trig functions

Other specialized functions also implemented into the calculator include hyperbolic and statistical functions, binary/octal/hexadecimal/sexagesimal conversions and graph plotting.

Programming
Like many Casio calculators, the FX-7000G includes a programming mode, in addition to its display and graphing mode. It holds 422 bytes of programming memory, less than half a kilobyte. However the calculator does allow for expanded/additional memory by a method of reducing the number of steps within a program. This is done by optimizing the number of steps a program has to fill a single unit of memory, instead of several. The user may save any program they create or are in the process of creating in one of ten programming slots, a feature also used in the Casio BASIC handheld computer.

The calculator uses a tokenized programming language (similar to the earlier FX-602P) which is well suited to writing more complex programs, as memory efficiency is a priority. Tokenization is performed by using characters and symbols in place of long lines of code to minimize the amount of memory being used. The User Manual programming catalog is written in these symbols, allowing for lengthier programs to be written with less effort and less memory. One example is a program which estimates a definite integral through the use of Simpson's Rule; this can be found within the user manual for reference.

The calculator has 26 numeric memories as standard. Additional memories can be created by reducing the number of bytes available for programs. Using this facility allows a total of 78 memories maximum.

Graphing
The calculator has a built in graphing feature which is unique to its model. The calculator can display either built-in graphs that are already programmed or display a user defined graph. The user also has the option to rewrite any of the previously programmed graphs.

Statistical graphs can also be generated: bar graphs, line graphs, normal distribution curves, regression lines.

Display and Exterior

Display
The FX-7000G incorporates an LCD Dot Matrix design via the display window. When set into character mode the calculator can display up to sixteen characters on each of its eight display lines. This sixteen character by eight line display is screened on the 96 × 64 dot matrix. The LCD is not capable of colour or grey scale display.

Exterior
A black casing surrounds the calculator along with a metal panel implemented on the rear; a large plastic screen protects the LCD display window as well. Keys are labeled and printed on orange, green, blue, red, and black malleable buttons.

Measurements
It has an approximate mass of  including batteries.

Power
The Casio Fx-7000G needs a 9.0 volt DC current lithium battery supply provided by 3 CR2032 type cells. The calculator does not accept an AC adapter and only uses batteries. The average battery life is around 120 hours which is shorter in length compared to similar models.

See also
Casio graphic calculators

References

External links
 Casio FX-7000g Page on ledudu's casio library
 Page on Void Ware, a graphing calculator site
 Page on DATAMATH  CALCULATOR  MUSEUM
 

Products introduced in 1985
fx-7000G
Graphing calculators